Infinity Train is an American animated anthology television series created by Owen Dennis, formerly a writer and storyboard artist on Regular Show, for Cartoon Network and HBO Max.

Series overview

Episodes

Pilot (2016)

Book One: The Perennial Child (2019)

The Train Documentaries (2019)

Book Two: Cracked Reflection (2020)

Book Three: Cult of the Conductor (2020)

Book Four: Duet (2021)

Notes

References 

2010s television-related lists
2020s television-related lists
Lists of Cartoon Network television series episodes
Lists of American children's animated television series episodes
Episodes